Sophie Yanow (born 1987) is an artist and graphic novelist from California.

Work 
In 2011 she moved to Montreal, Quebec for an artist residency at La Maison de la Bande Dessinée, where she became a member of the Colosse comics. With Colosse she published a collection of journal comics recording her transition to Montreal under the title In Situ, a nod to site-specificity in her creative process. 

In Montreal she has also participated in projects such as the 48 Heures de la Bande Dessinée, the strike related online Manif de Bonhommes, and La Hausse en Question strike zine. Her work has also appeared online in places like Top Shelf Comix and The Rumpus.

Her 2020 comic "The Contradictions" (published by Drawn & Quarterly in Montreal) a fictionalised account of studying abroad in Paris, was described as "a masterpiece" by Alison Bechdel.

In 2019, she won the Eisner Award for Best Webcomic for The Contradictions and a Scott Moncrieff Prize for her translation of Pretending is Lying by Dominique Goblet.

Books 

 War Of Streets and Houses (2013)
 What Is A Glacier? (2017)
 The Contradictions (2020)

References 

1987 births
American graphic novelists
Living people